Robert Christophe (22 February 1938 – 18 April 2016) was a French swimmer who competed in the 1956, 1960, and 1964 Summer Olympics. He was born in Marseille.

References

External links

1938 births
2016 deaths
Swimmers from Marseille
French male backstroke swimmers
French male freestyle swimmers
Olympic swimmers of France
Swimmers at the 1956 Summer Olympics
Swimmers at the 1960 Summer Olympics
Swimmers at the 1964 Summer Olympics
European Aquatics Championships medalists in swimming
Mediterranean Games medalists in swimming
Mediterranean Games gold medalists for France
Swimmers at the 1959 Mediterranean Games
20th-century French people
21st-century French people